Lebanese Arabic, or simply Lebanese, is a variety of North Levantine Arabic, indigenous to and spoken primarily in Lebanon, with significant linguistic influences borrowed from other Middle Eastern and European languages and is in some ways unique from other varieties of Arabic. Due to multilingualism and pervasive diglossia among Lebanese people (a majority of the Lebanese people are bilingual or trilingual), it is not uncommon for Lebanese people to code-switch between or mix Lebanese Arabic, English, and French in their daily speech. It is also spoken among the Lebanese diaspora.

Lebanese Arabic is a descendant of the Arabic dialects introduced to the Levant and other Arabic dialects that were already spoken in other parts of the levant in the 7th century AD which gradually supplanted various indigenous Northwest Semitic languages to become the regional lingua franca, replacing Greek in that role. As a result of this prolonged process of language shift, Lebanese Arabic possesses a significant Aramaic substratum, along with later non-Semitic adstrate influences from Ottoman Turkish, English, and French. As a variety of Levantine Arabic, Lebanese Arabic is most closely related to Syrian Arabic and shares many innovations with Palestinian and Jordanian Arabic.

Differences from Standard Arabic
Lebanese Arabic shares many features with other modern varieties of Arabic. Lebanese Arabic, like many other spoken Levantine Arabic varieties, has a syllable structure very different from that of Modern Standard Arabic. While Standard Arabic can have only one consonant at the beginning of a syllable, after which a vowel must follow, Lebanese Arabic commonly has two consonants in the onset.
 Morphology: no mood or grammatical case markings.
 Number: verbal agreement regarding number and gender is required for all subjects, whether already mentioned or not.
 Vocabulary: many borrowings from other languages; most prominently Syriac-Aramaic, Western-Aramaic, Persian, Phoenician, Ottoman Turkish, French, Coptic, as well as, less significantly, from English.
 Some authors, such as the Lebanese statistician Nassim Nicholas Taleb, believe that a significant part of the Lebanese grammatical structure is due to Aramaic influences.

Examples

 The following example demonstrates two differences between Standard Arabic (Literary Arabic) and Spoken Lebanese Arabic: Coffee, Literary Arabic: ; Lebanese Arabic: .
 As a general rule, the voiceless uvular plosive  is replaced with glottal stop , e.g. "minute" becomes .
In urban dialects (i.e. Beiruti)  has replaced  and sometimes medial , and  has replaced final  making it indistinguishable with tāʾ marbūtah (ة). Also,  has replaced ;  replacing some short s.
It is assumed that this is to maintain an audible difference between the two words which were originally homophones.

Contentions regarding descent from Arabic
Lebanese literary figure Said Akl led a movement to recognize the "Lebanese language" as a distinct prestigious language and oppose it to Standard Arabic, which he considered a "dead language". Akl's idea was relatively successful among the Lebanese diaspora.

Several non-linguist commentators, most notably the statistician and essayist Nassim Nicholas Taleb, have claimed that the Lebanese vernacular is not in fact a variety of Arabic at all, but rather a separate Central Semitic language descended from older languages including Aramaic; those who espouse this viewpoint suggest that a large percentage of its vocabulary consists of Arabic loanwords, and that this compounds with the use of the Arabic alphabet to disguise the language's true nature. Taleb has recommended that the language be called Northwestern Levantine or neo-Canaanite. However, this classification is at odds with the comparative method of historical linguistics; the lexicon of Lebanese, including basic lexicon, exhibits sound changes and other features that are unique to the Arabic branch of the Semitic language family, making it difficult to categorize it under any other branch, and observations of its morphology also suggest a substantial Arabic makeup. However, this is disputable as Arabic and Aramaic share many cognates, so only words proper to the Arabic language and cognates with Arabic-specific sound changes can certainly only be from Arabic. It is plausible that many words used in Lebanese Arabic today may have been influenced by their respective Aramaic and Canaanite cognates.

Historian and linguist Ahmad Al-Jallad has argued that modern dialects are not descendants of Classical Arabic, forms of Arabic existing before the formation of Classical Arabic being the historical foundation for the various dialects. Thus he states that, "most of the familiar modern dialects (i.e. Rabat, Cairo, Damascus, etc.) are sedimentary structures, containing layers of Arabics that must be teased out on a case-by-case basis." In essence, the linguistic consensus is that Lebanese too is a variety of Arabic.

Phonology

Consonants 

The phonemes  are not native to Lebanese Arabic and are only found in loanwords.
The velar stop  occurs in native Lebanese Arabic words but is generally restricted to loanwords.
 can be heard among Druze speech, alternating with a glottal .

Vowels and diphthongs

Comparison 
This table shows the correspondence between general Lebanese Arabic vowel phonemes and their counterpart realizations in Modern Standard Arabic (MSA) and other Levantine Arabic varieties.

Regional varieties
Although there is a modern Lebanese Arabic dialect mutually understood by Lebanese people, there are regionally distinct variations with, at times, unique pronunciation, grammar, and vocabulary.

Widely used regional varieties include:
 Beiruti varieties, further distributed according to neighbourhoods, the notable ones being Achrafieh variety, Basta variety, Ras Beirut variety, etc.
 Northern varieties, further distributed regionally, the most notable ones being Tripoli variety, Zgharta variety, Bsharri variety, Koura variety, Akkar variety.
 Southern varieties, with notable ones being the Tyre and Bint Jbeil varieties.
 Beqaa varieties, further divided into varieties, the notable ones being Zahlé and Baalbek-Hermel varieties.
 Mount Lebanon varieties, further divided into regional varieties like the Keserwan variety, the Matin dialect, Shouf variety, etc.

Writing system

Lebanese Arabic is rarely written, except in novels where a dialect is implied or in some types of poetry that do not use classical Arabic at all. Lebanese Arabic is also utilized in many Lebanese songs, theatrical pieces, local television and radio productions, and very prominently in zajal.

Formal publications in Lebanon, such as newspapers, are typically written in Modern Standard Arabic, French, or English.

While Arabic script is usually employed, informal usage such as online chat may mix and match Latin letter transliterations. The Lebanese poet Said Akl proposed the use of the Latin alphabet but did not gain wide acceptance. Whereas some works, such as Romeo and Juliet and Plato's Dialogues have been transliterated using such systems, they have not gained widespread acceptance. Yet, now, most Arabic web users, when short of an Arabic keyboard, transliterate the Lebanese Arabic words in the Latin alphabet in a pattern similar to the Said Akl alphabet, the only difference being the use of digits to render the Arabic letters with no obvious equivalent in the Latin alphabet.

There is still today no generally accepted agreement on how to use the Latin alphabet to transliterate Lebanese Arabic words. However, Lebanese people are now using Latin numbers while communicating online to make up for sounds not directly associable to Latin letters. This is especially popular over text messages and apps such as WhatsApp.
Examples:
 7 for ح
 3 for ع
 2 for ء or ق (qaf is often pronounced as a glottal stop)

In 2010, The Lebanese Language Institute has released a Lebanese Arabic keyboard layout and made it easier to write Lebanese Arabic in a Latin script, using unicode-compatible symbols to substitute for missing sounds.

Said Akl's orthography

Said Akl, the poet, philosopher, writer, playwright and language reformer, designed an alphabet for the Lebanese language using the Latin alphabet in addition to a few newly designed letters and some accented Latin letters to suit the Lebanese phonology in the following pattern:
 Capitalization and punctuation are used normally the same way they are used in French and English
 Some written consonant-letters, depending on their position, inherited a preceding vowel. As L and T.
 Emphatic consonants are not distinguished from normal ones, with the exception of  represented by ƶ. Probably Said Akl did not acknowledge any other emphatic consonant.
 Stress is not marked.
 Long vowels and geminated consonants are represented by double letters.
 ꞓ which represents  (Arabic hamza) was written even initially.
 All of the basic Latin alphabet are used, in addition to other diacriticized ones. Most of the letters loosely represent their IPA counterparts, with some exceptions:

Roger Makhlouf largely uses Akl's alphabet in his Lebanese-English Lexicon.

See also
 Varieties of Arabic
 Levantine Arabic
 North Levantine Arabic

References

Bibliography
 
 
 Elie Kallas, Atabi Lebnaaniyyi. Un livello soglia per l'apprendimento del neoarabo libanese, Cafoscarina, Venice, 1995.
 Angela Daiana Langone, Btesem ente lebneni. Commedia in dialetto libanese di Yahya Jaber, Università degli Studi La Sapienza, Rome, 2004.
 Jérome Lentin, "Classification et typologie des dialectes du Bilad al-Sham", in Matériaux Arabes et Sudarabiques n. 6, 1994, 11–43.
 
 
 Franck Salameh, "Language, Memory, and Identity in the Middle East", Lexington Books, 2010.
 Abdul-Karim, K. 1979. Aspects of the Phonology of Lebanese Arabic. University of Illinois at Urbana-Champaign Doctoral Dissertation.
 Bishr, Kemal Mohamed Aly. 1956. A grammatical study of Lebanese Arabic. (Doctoral dissertation, University of London; 470pp.)
 Choueiri, Lina. 2002. Issues in the syntax of resumption: restrictive relatives in Lebanese Arabic. Ann Arbor: UMI. (Doctoral dissertation, University of Los Angeles; xi+376pp.)
 Makki, Elrabih Massoud. 1983. The Lebanese dialect of Arabic: Southern Region. (Doctoral dissertation, Georgetown University; 155pp.)

External links

 Learn Arabic Lebanese with Hiba Najem
 Language Wave podcast
 Lebanese Language Institute
 Lebanese Arabic Latin alphabet
 Manual with grammar of Lebanese Arabic for the Dutch UNIFIL detachment
 Summary of commonly used conventions of writing the Lebanese Arabic spoken language using Latin alphabet

 
Articles containing video clips